Yonder Mountain String Band is an eponymous progressive bluegrass album by the Yonder Mountain String Band. It was released May 9, 2006 by Vanguard Records.

Track listing

 "Sidewalk Stars" (Adam Aijala, Jeff Austin, Dave Johnston, Ben Kaufmann, Tom Rothrock) – 4:13
 "I Ain't Been Myself in Years" (Benny Galloway) – 3:08
 "How 'Bout You?" (Aijala, Austin, Johnston, Kaufmann, Rothrock) – 3:46
 "Angel" (Aijala, Austin, Johnston, Kaufmann, Rothrock) – 4:48
 "Fastball" (Aijala, Austin, Johnston, Kaufmann, Rothrock) – 1:06
 "East Nashville Easter" (Austin, T. Snider) – 4:49
 "Just the Same" (Johnston) – 4:02
 "Classic Situation" (Aijala, Austin, Johnston, Kaufmann, Rothrock) – 3:22
 "Night Out" (Aijala, Johnston) – 3:38
 "Midwest Gospel Radio" (Aijala, Austin, Johnston, Kaufmann, Rothrock) – 2:50
 "Troubled Mind" (Kaufmann) – 3:35
 "Wind's on Fire" (Johnston) – 2:32

Chart performance

Album

Personnel

Yonder Mountain String Band

 Dave Johnston – banjo, vocals, acoustic guitar on tracks 1 & 12
 Jeff Austin –  mandolin, vocals, guitar on track 8
 Ben Kaufmann – bass, vocals, acoustic guitar on track 3, electric piano on track 3, piano on track 12
 Adam Aijala – acoustic guitar, vocals, electric guitar on track 3, slide guitar on track 12

Other musicians

 Darol Anger – fiddle on track 4
 Tom Rothrock – thumb, 1/4 cable & amplifier on track 5, beats on track 10
 Pete Thomas – drums on tracks 3 & 8

Technical

 David Raccuglia – photography
 Tom Rothrock – producer, amplifiers, beats
 Mike Tarantino – engineer
 Don C. Tyler – mastering

Notes

External links
 Yonder Mountain String Band Official Homepage
 Frog Pad Records Homepage

2006 albums
Yonder Mountain String Band albums
Frog Pad Records albums
Albums produced by Tom Rothrock